Peptide transporter 1  (PepT 1) also known as solute carrier family 15 member 1 (SLC15A1) is a protein that in humans is encoded by SLC15A1 gene. PepT 1 is a solute carrier for oligopeptides. It functions in renal oligopeptide reabsorption and in the intestines in a proton dependent way, hence acting like a cotransporter.

Function 

SLC15A1is localized to the brush border membrane of the intestinal epithelium and mediates the uptake of di- and tripeptides from the lumen into the enterocytes. This protein plays an important role in the uptake and digestion of dietary proteins. This protein also facilitates the absorption of numerous peptidomimetic drugs. Peptide transporter 1 functions in nutrient and drug transport have been studied using intestinal organoids.

See also 
 Solute carrier family

References

Further reading 

 
 
 
 
 
 
 
 
 
 
 
 
 
 

Membrane proteins
Solute carrier family